The Night Is My Kingdom (French: La nuit est mon royaume) is a 1951 French drama film directed by Georges Lacombe and starring Jean Gabin, Simone Valère and Gérard Oury. Gabin was awarded the Volpi Cup for Best Actor at the 1951 Venice Film Festival. It was shot at the Saint-Maurice Studios in Paris. The film's sets were designed by the art directors Rino Mondellini and René Moulaert.

Main cast

References

Bibliography 
 Aitken, Ian. The Concise Routledge Encyclopedia of the Documentary Film. Routledge, 2013.

External links 
 

1951 films
1951 drama films
French drama films
1950s French-language films
Films directed by Georges Lacombe
French black-and-white films
1950s French films